X-Men '92 was originally a limited series as one of the many tie-in titles for Marvel's 2015 Secret Wars event and later was released in its second volume as a continuous series in early 2016, starring members of the popular 1990s Fox Kids Saturday-morning cartoon X-Men.

Publication history
As part of the 2015 Secret Wars event comic, Marvel revived older series and explore alternate comic universes, one of the continuities explored was the 1992 X-Men animated series. Chris Sims and Chad Bowers wrote a four-issue limited series drawn by Scott Koblish. The premier issue sold 97,617 issues and was the 8th highest selling issue that month. The first volume was also released under Marvel's Online Infinite Comics series in an eight-issue story arc. After Secret Wars ended, the series returned in a second volume that lasted 10 issues. The series was praised for its outlandish '90s style and color and many '90s cultural references, including a crossover with The Toadies. When asked later on Twitter, Chris Sims revealed that this series does not actually take place in the same continuity as the X-Men cartoon.

On January 14, 2022, it was announced by Marvel that a 5 part series would be launching on April 6, 2022 (cover dated June 2022), titled X-Men '92: House of XCII.

Fictional team biography

Volume 1
The team is seen living a fairly peaceful life in the Battlezone called Westchester. The baron of this region is Senator Kelly. He has little difficulty since most of the villains were wiped out in a previous war and the remaining villains were sent to "Bureau of Super-Powers" run by Cassandra Nova for rehabilitation. After a rogue Sentinel attack the X-Men are invited to the facility to learn about process. The X-Men are then put into the virtual training pods, but were really sent into the Astral Plane, since Nova was actually possessed by the Shadow King. The team is saved by Jubilee, who Nova didn't consider a big enough threat and didn't put into the VR pod and by the X-Force, who assault the facility. Xavier is able to repel the Shadow King and the X-Men save Baron Kelly, but a mega-Sentinel is released against the X-Mansion. The X-Men and X-Force combine to defeat the machine before it causes too much damage.

Volume 2

The World is a Vampire

The Upstarts, a group of evil mutants, are playing a game to find who can hurt the X-Men the most. The Von Strucker twins trick The People's Protectorate to attack the X-man.  They came to the mansion hunting Maverick, who unbeknownst to them released a computer virus into Cerebro. The Von Strucker twins released Alpha Red, the vampire son of Dracula who has been locked up for 50 years after the Soviets made him into a super-soldier, who converted Jubilee and Maverick into vampires, then most of the other students, People's Protectorate and X-Men, into vampires. The virus, called Darkhold, in Cerebro converts vampire DNA to remove their weakness against sunlight. Dead Girl, immune to the vampires, uses Cerebro to remove the virus. The virus's avatar asks her is she wants to delete the vampiric DNA and convert the vampires into humans. She is pressured to decide and deletes the vampiric DNA. In the end she is happy to have saved her friends, but is racked with irony that humans wish to delete mutant DNA and convert them to humans.

During these events, Scott and Jean are on vacation in Anchorage, AK, but are teleported to the future by Rachel Summers. This dystopian future is temporally ruled by Mister Sinister while Apocalypse is conquering the galaxy. Rachel tells them she needs their help to defeat Sinister, but it turns out she was helping Sinister harvest their genes to create Nathan Summers in order to defeat Apocalypse. In the end, Rachel is racked with guilt and kills Sinister, but drains the last of her Phoenix Force, so Scott and Jean are teleported back and Nathan stays with Blaquesmith.

Lilapalooza
Lila Cheney is performing a concert with The Toadies and The Flaming Lips in order to create peace between humans and mutants. The X-Men act as the security, which is helpful since Death's Head comes to collect a bounty on Lila. Fabian Cortez appears and overcharges Lila's teleporting powers and she takes the X-Men to a distant planet inhabited by The Brood. After a brief skirmish with the Brood, the X-Men realize they are mutants, like them, and outcasts from the rest of the Brood hive, then protect them from Gladiator and The Shi'ar During the battle the X-Men steal the Shi'ar ship and return to Earth. Meanwhile, back at the  concert X-Factor who need to fight the rebellious mutants. Then Apocalypse and a group of mutant villains appear suggesting a truce. Cable and the X-Force appear and fight, but Professor X realizes that Apocalypse's intentions are semi-altruistic. He plans to convert all humans into mutants and take over the world, so he can defeat the Celestial Exodus. Cyclops and Jean Grey return from the future with the Darkhold. Professor X decides to use it to convert every human into a mutant only if humankind agrees.

In the denouement humankind overwhelmingly agrees to help and Professor X uses the Darkhold to convert everyone into a mutant. Now with every person on Earth super-powered, they all press the attacks against the evil Celestial.

References

2015 comics debuts
Comics characters introduced in 2015
Marvel Comics superhero teams
Marvel Comics mutants
Marvel Comics titles
X-Men titles